The 1892 Tennessee gubernatorial election was held on November 8, 1892. Democratic nominee Peter Turney defeated Republican nominee George W. Winstead with 47.86% of the vote.

General election

Candidates
Major party candidates
Peter Turney, Democratic
George W. Winstead, Republican

Other candidates
John P. Buchanan, People's
Edward H. East, Prohibition

Results

References

1892
Tennessee
Gubernatorial